The island's name, Marchena Island (Spanish: Isla Marchena), comes from the Spanish monk, Frey Antonio de Marchena. It has an area of 130 km2 and a maximum altitude of 343 meters. The island is not set up for visitors, although the surrounding water is used by aquatic divers on organised tours.

People generally see the island as they sail around the northern part of Isabela on the way to Tower Island. Marchena is Tower Island's nearest neighbor, about 45 miles due west.

Like many of the Galápagos volcanos, Marchena has a caldera. Marchena's caldera is roughly elliptical and measures , within the range of caldera sizes of the large western volcanoes. Marchena's caldera is unusual, however, in that it has been almost completely filled with young lavas, some of which has spilled over and down the sides. The oldest lava pools go back 500,000 years.

See also
List of volcanoes in Ecuador

References

External links

Islands of the Galápagos Islands
Uninhabited islands of Ecuador
Volcanoes of the Galápagos Islands
Calderas of the Galápagos Islands
Pleistocene shield volcanoes
Active volcanoes